The 1935 Spring Hill Badgers football team was an American football team that represented Spring Hill College as a member of the Dixie Conference during the 1935 college football season. In their seventh year under head coach William T. Daly, the team compiled a 7–2–2 record.

Schedule

References

Spring Hill
Spring Hill Badgers football seasons
Spring Hill Badgers football